Chan Seng Khai was the second mayor of Kuching South City Council since 1997. He succeeded Datuk Song Swee Guan, who was the first mayor of the city, in 1988 when Kuching was elevated to City status and partitioned into South and North. Chan is a member of Sarawak United People's Party and elected state assemblyman of the Batu Lintang area in Kuching in 1991, 1996 and 2001.  In 2006, during the Sarawak's state election, he lost in his re-election bid as state assemblyman to Democratic Action Party (DAP) candidate Voon Lee Shan.

External links
 Kuching South City Council website

Malaysian people of Chinese descent
1953 births
Living people
People from Sarawak
Sarawak United Peoples' Party politicians
Malaysian people of Hakka descent
Members of the Sarawak State Legislative Assembly